Robert William Thurbon (February 22, 1918 – September 11, 2000) was a professional American football halfback in the National Football League (NFL) and the All-America Football Conference (AAFC). He was born in Erie, Pennsylvania. He played one season each for the NFL's Steagles and Card-Pitt and the AAFC's Buffalo Bisons.

References

1918 births
2000 deaths
American football halfbacks
Basketball coaches from Pennsylvania
Buffalo Bisons (AAFC) players
Card-Pitt players
Edinboro Fighting Scots football coaches
Edinboro Fighting Scots men's basketball coaches
Pittsburgh Panthers football players
Steagles players and personnel
Sportspeople from Erie, Pennsylvania
Players of American football from Pennsylvania